In set theory, a universal set is a set which contains all objects, including itself. In set theory as usually formulated, it can be proven in multiple ways that a universal set does not exist. However, some non-standard variants of set theory include a universal set.

Reasons for nonexistence
Many set theories do not allow for the existence of a universal set. There are several different arguments for its non-existence, based on different choices of axioms for set theory.

Regularity
In Zermelo–Fraenkel set theory, the axiom of regularity and axiom of pairing prevent any set from containing itself. Because a universal set would necessarily contain itself, it cannot exist under these axioms.

Russell's paradox

Russell's paradox prevents the existence of a universal set in set theories that include Zermelo's axiom of comprehension.
This axiom states that, for any formula  and any set , there exists a set 

that contains exactly those elements  of  that satisfy .

As a consequence of this axiom, to every set  there corresponds another set  consisting of the elements of  that do not contain themselves.  cannot contain itself, because it consists only of sets that do not contain themselves. Therefore, every set  is non-universal: there exists a set  that it does not contain. This indeed holds even with predicative comprehension and over intuitionistic logic.

Cantor's theorem

Another difficulty with the idea of a universal set concerns the power set of the set of all sets. Because this power set is a set of sets, it would necessarily be a subset of the set of all sets, provided that both exist.  However, this conflicts with Cantor's theorem that the power set of any set (whether infinite or not) always has strictly higher cardinality than the set itself.

Theories of universality
The difficulties associated with a universal set can be avoided either by using a variant of set theory in which the axiom of comprehension is restricted in some way, or by using a universal object that is not considered to be a set.

Restricted comprehension
In these theories, Zermelo's axiom of comprehension does not hold in general, and the axiom of comprehension of naive set theory is restricted in a different way. A set theory containing a universal set is necessarily a non-well-founded set theory.
The most widely studied set theory with a universal set is Willard Van Orman Quine's New Foundations. Alonzo Church and Arnold Oberschelp also published work on such set theories.  Church speculated that his theory might be extended in a manner consistent with Quine's, but this is not possible for Oberschelp's, since in it the singleton function is provably a set, which leads immediately to paradox in New Foundations.

Another example is positive set theory, where the axiom of comprehension is restricted to hold only for the positive formulas (formulas that do not contain negations). Such set theories are motivated by notions of closure in topology.

Universal objects that are not sets

The idea of a universal set seems intuitively desirable in the Zermelo–Fraenkel set theory, particularly because most versions of this theory do allow the use of quantifiers over all sets (see universal quantifier).  One way of allowing an object that behaves similarly to a universal set, without creating paradoxes, is to describe  and similar large collections as proper classes rather than as sets. One difference between a universal set and a universal class is that the universal class does not contain itself, because proper classes cannot be elements of other classes. Russell's paradox does not apply in these theories because the axiom of comprehension operates on sets, not on classes.

The category of sets can also be considered to be a universal object that is, again, not itself a set. It has all sets as elements, and also includes arrows for all functions from one set to another. 
Again, it does not contain itself, because it is not itself a set.

See also 

 Universe (mathematics)
 Grothendieck universe
 Domain of discourse
 Von Neumann–Bernays–Gödel set theory — an extension of ZFC that admits the class of all sets

Notes

References 

 Willard Van Orman Quine (1937) "New Foundations for Mathematical Logic," American Mathematical Monthly 44, pp. 70–80.

External links
 
 Bibliography: Set Theory with a Universal Set, originated by T. E. Forster and maintained by Randall Holmes.

Basic concepts in set theory
Families of sets
Paradoxes of naive set theory
Systems of set theory
Wellfoundedness
Self-reference